Lee Chung Man (born 20 November 1967) is a Hong Kong fencer. He competed in the individual and team foil events at the 1988 Summer Olympics.

References

External links
 

1967 births
Living people
Hong Kong male foil fencers
Olympic fencers of Hong Kong
Fencers at the 1988 Summer Olympics
Asian Games medalists in fencing
Fencers at the 1990 Asian Games
Fencers at the 1994 Asian Games
Asian Games bronze medalists for Hong Kong
Medalists at the 1990 Asian Games
20th-century Hong Kong people